Chang (Changyanguh), or Mochungrr, is a Northern Naga language of northeastern India. It is spoken in 36 villages of Tuensang District in east-central Nagaland (Ethnologue). Ethnologue reports that the Tuensang village dialect is the central speech variety that is intelligible to all Chang speakers.

References

Languages of Nagaland
Sal languages
Endangered languages of India